Tripos may refer to:
 Tripos, a course system at the University of Cambridge
 TRIPOS, a computer operating system
 Tripos (dinoflagellate), a genus of marine organisms in the family Ceratiaceae
 Tripos, in mathematics, a higher-order fibration over the category Set for which the products and coproducts induced by functions satisfy the Beck-Chevalley condition.